Thrombolites (from Ancient Greek θρόμβος thrómbos meaning "clot" and λῐ́θος líthos meaning "stone") are clotted accretionary structures formed in shallow water by the trapping, binding, and cementation of sedimentary grains by biofilms of microorganisms, especially cyanobacteria.

Structures 
Thrombolites have a clotted structure without the laminae of stromatolites. Each clot within a thrombolite mound is a separate cyanobacterial colony. The clots are on the scale of millimetres to centimetres and may be interspersed with sand, mud or sparry carbonate. Clots that make up thrombolites are called thromboids to avoid confusion with other clotted textures. The larger clots make up more than 40% of a thrombolite's volume and each clot has a complex internal structure of cells and rimmed lobes resulting primarily from calcification of the cyanobacterial colony. Very little sediment is found within the clots because the main growth method is calcification rather than sediment trapping. There is active debate about the size of thromboids, with some seeing thromboids as a macrostructural feature (domical hemispheroid) and others viewing thromboids as a mesostructural feature (random polylobate and subspherical mesoclots).

Types 
There are two main types of thrombolites:

Calcified microbe thrombolites 
This type of thrombolites contain clots that are dominantly composed of calcified microfossil components. These clots do not have a fixed form or size and can expand vertically. Furthermore, burrows and trilobite fragments can exist in these thrombolites.

Coarse agglutinated thrombolites 
This type of thrombolites is composed of small openings that trap fine-grained sediments. They are also known "thrombolitic-stromatolites" due to their close relation with the same composition of stromatolites. Because they trap sediment, their formation is linked to the rise of algal-cyanobacterial mats.

Differences from stromatolites 
Thrombolites can be distinguished from microbialites or stromatolites by their massive size, which is characterized by macroscopic clotted fabric. Stromatolites are similar but consist of layered accretions. Thrombolites appear with random patterns that can be seen by the naked eye, while stromatolites has the texture of built up layers.

Ancient fossil record 
Calcified microbe thrombolites occur in sedimentary rocks from the shallow water ocean during the Neoproterozoic and early Palaeozoic.

Locations 
Thrombolites are rare on modern Earth, but exist in areas of groundwater discharge with high concentration of nutrients and organic ions, such as shallow seawater, freshwater, and saltwater lakes, and streams. Thrombolites are now found in only a few places in the world, including:

 Laguna Negra, Catamarca, Argentina
 Basin Lakes and Blue Lake, Australia
 Lake Clifton, Australia
 Lake Richmond, Australia
 Lake Thetis, Australia
 Flower's Cove, Canada
 Manito Lake and Pavilion Lake, Canada
 Lakes Nuoertu and Huhejaran, China
 Kiritimati Atoll, Kiribati
 Cuatro Ciénegas and Lake Alchichica, Mexico
 Ciocaia, Romania
 Lake Van and Salda Lake, Turkey
 Green Lake, United States

References

Trace fossils
Cyanobacteria